Kalamare is a village in Central District of Botswana. It is located 35 km north-west of Mahalapye. The village has primary called Kalamare Primary School and Kalamare Junior Secondary School and a health clinic. The population was 2,241 in 2001 census.

References

Populated places in Central District (Botswana)
Villages in Botswana